Yves Montigny is a Canadian politician, who was elected to the National Assembly of Quebec in the 2022 Quebec general election. He represents the riding of René-Lévesque as a member of the Coalition Avenir Québec.

Prior to his election to the legislature, Montigny was the mayor of Baie-Comeau.

References

21st-century Canadian politicians
Coalition Avenir Québec MNAs
People from Baie-Comeau
Mayors of places in Quebec
French Quebecers
Living people
Year of birth missing (living people)